Scotinosphaera is a genus of algae belonging to the family Scotinosphaeraceae.

The genus was first described by Klebs in 1881.

Synonym: Kentrosphaera Borzì, 1883

Species:
 Scotinosphaera facciolae

References

Ulvophyceae
Ulvophyceae genera